Village development committee may refer to:
 Village development committee (India)
 Village development committee (Nepal)